John Pointer is a former professional American football player who played linebacker for the Green Bay Packers.

References

1958 births
American football linebackers
Green Bay Packers players
Vanderbilt Commodores football players
Living people
Edmonton Elks players
Toronto Argonauts players
Winnipeg Blue Bombers players
Montreal Concordes players